As of 2015, Tirukkural has been translated into Czech only once.

History of translations
The only known translation of the Kural text in Czech is some selections that appeared in Novy Orient, a Czech journal from Prague, during 1952–54. These were translated by renowned Tamil scholar Kamil Zvelebil.

Translations

See also
 Tirukkural translations
 List of Tirukkural translations by language

References

External links
 

Czech
Translations into Czech